Nnaemeka Anyamele (born 16 May 1994) is a Finnish footballer who plays as a left-back or winger for EIF. He has previously played for Klubi-04, FC Honka, Pallohonka, HIFK and Gnistan.

Club career
Anyamele spent his youth with Helsingin Ponnistus and HJK, before he joined Klubi-04. He made his Kakkonen debut with Klubi on 4 August 2011, coming on as a half-time substitute for Henri Lassila in a 5–0 win over Sudet at the Sonera Stadium. He made four further appearances in the 2011 season, before scoring two goals in 20 appearances in the 2012 campaign. He scored his first goal in senior football on 21 April 2012, in a 6–0 home win over LoPa.

He joined Mika Lehkosuo's FC Honka of the Veikkausliiga for the 2013 season, and was loaned out to Pallohonka back in the Kakkonen. Honka finished as runners-up to HJK, with Anyamele scoring one goal in 12 league games. He won a regular first team place under new manager Shefki Kuqi during the 2014 campaign, scoring five goals in 37 games as the club were relegated in 11th-place. He also played twice in the UEFA Europa League, featuring in both legs of the club's 3–2 aggregate victory over Estonian side Sillamäe Kalev. Anyamele signed a two-year contract with HIFK in November 2014, and said that manager Jani Honkavaara's promise to play him at left-back convinced him to join the club. He spent the 2015 and 2016 seasons at the club, scoring three goals in 53 games.

On 27 January 2022, Anyamele returned to HIFK. On 29 March 2022 his contract with HIFK was terminated. On the next day, Anyamele signed with EIF in Ykkönen.

International career
Anyamele is of Nigerian descent, but has represented Finland at youth-team level.

Statistics

Honours
with FC Honka
Veikkausliiga runner-up: 2013

References

1994 births
Living people
Finnish people of Nigerian descent
Finnish footballers
Finnish expatriate footballers
Finland youth international footballers
Finland under-21 international footballers
Association football fullbacks
Association football wingers
Veikkausliiga players
Kakkonen players
Regionalliga players
Helsingin Jalkapalloklubi players
FC Honka players
HIFK Fotboll players
Klubi 04 players
Pallohonka players
IF Gnistan players
BSV Schwarz-Weiß Rehden players
Ekenäs IF players
Finnish expatriate sportspeople in Germany
Expatriate footballers in Germany
People from Tornio
Sportspeople from Lapland (Finland)